Syeda Anwara Taimur (24 November 1936 – 28 September 2020) was an Indian politician, who was the chief minister of the Indian state of Assam from 6 December 1980 to 30 June 1981. She died in Australia on 28 September 2020. She was a leader of the Indian National Congress party in Assam and a member of the All India Congress Committee (AICC).

Personal life 

She graduated from Aligarh Muslim University with economics honors.

Anwara was lecturer in Economics in Debicharan Barua Girls College, Jorhat in 1956.

Political career 

In the history of Assam, she was the only female and Muslim Chief Minister of the state. She was Chief Minister of Assam from 6 December 1980 to 30 June 1981. In Indian history also, Syeda Anwara Taimur was the first Muslim woman Chief Minister of any state. Her term as chief minister ended when the state was put under President's rule for six months.

From 1983 to 1985 she was the PWD minister of the same state.

She was an elected member of the Assam Assembly (MLA) in 1972, 1978, 1983, and 1991. In 1988 she was nominated to the Indian Parliament (Rajya Sabha). In 1991 she was appointed to the post of Minister for Agriculture in Assam.

Anwara joined All India United Democratic Front in 2011. Anwara is among the notable names not included in the final draft of 2018 National Register of Citizens (NRC), for which, she later clarified that her family members may not have applied to get her name included in the list.

Death
Taimur died on 28 September 2020 due to cardiac arrest in Australia, where she stayed with her son for her last four years.

Positions held

Notes
Encyclopaedia of Scheduled Tribes in India: In Five Volumes by P. K. Mohanty Page 124.

References

External links
 Profile on Rajya Sabha website

|-

|-

Aligarh Muslim University alumni
1936 births
2020 deaths
Assam MLAs 1972–1978
Assam MLAs 1978–1983
Assam MLAs 1983–1985
Assam MLAs 1991–1996
Chief Ministers of Assam
Women members of the Assam Legislative Assembly
People from Jorhat district
Indian National Congress politicians from Assam
Nominated members of the Rajya Sabha
Rajya Sabha members from Assam
Women chief ministers of Indian states
Chief ministers from Indian National Congress
All India United Democratic Front politicians
20th-century Indian women politicians
20th-century Indian politicians
Indian Muslims
Women members of the Rajya Sabha